Sehowal is a village in the Sialkot District of Punjab province of Pakistan. It is located at 32°19'0N 74°47'0E with an altitude of 254 metres (836 feet).

References

Villages in Sialkot District